Baeva may refer to:

People
 Alena Baeva (born 1985), Russian violinist
 Irina Baeva (born 1992). Russian television actress
 Vera Baeva (born 1930), Bulgarian writer and composer

Other
 Baeva livada, village in Bulgaria